The British 30th Division was a New Army division that was originally made up of battalions raised by public subscription or private patronage.  The division was taken over by the British War Office in August 1915 and moved to France in December.  It served on the Western Front for the duration of the First World War.

Unit history 
The Division was the first of the six created for the Fourth New Army on 10 December 1914. It landed in France in December 1915. It saw action at the Battle of the Somme in autumn 1916 and the Battle of Passchendaele in autumn 1917. It was disbanded on 1 September 1919.

Order of Battle 
The following units served with the division:
 21st Brigade

The brigade joined from the 7th Division in December 1915, swapping with the 91st Brigade.

2nd Battalion, Bedfordshire Regiment (transferred to 89th Brigade 20 December 1915)
2nd Battalion, Alexandra, Princess of Wales's Own (Yorkshire Regiment) (left May 1918)
2nd Battalion, Royal Scots Fusiliers (transferred to 90th Brigade 20 December 1915)
2nd Battalion, The Duke of Edinburgh's (Wiltshire Regiment) (left May 1918)
18th (Service) Battalion, King's Regiment (Liverpool) (joined from 89th Brigade 20 December 1915, rejoined 89th Brigade February 1918)
19th (Service) Battalion, Manchester Regiment (4th City) (joined from 90th Brigade 20 December 1915 disbanded February 1918)
17th (Service) Battalion, Manchester Regiment (2nd City) (joined February 1918, left as cadre June 1918)
2/5th (Service) Battalion, Lincolnshire Regiment (joined May 1918, left June 1918)
21st Machine Gun Company (joined 8 March 1916, moved to 30th Battalion Machine Gun Corps (M.G.C.) 1 March 1918
21st Trench Mortar Battery	formed by 5 July 1916

On reorganisation in July 1918:

7th (South Irish Horse) Battalion, The Royal Irish Regiment
1/6th Battalion, Cheshire Regiment
2/23rd (County of London) Battalion, London Regiment
21st Trench Mortar Battery

 89th Brigade 

17th (Service) Battalion, King's Regiment (Liverpool) (left June 1918)
18th (Service) Battalion, King's Regiment (Liverpool) (transferred to 21st Brigade December 1915, returned from 21st Brigade February 1918, left June 1918)
19th (Service) Battalion, King's Regiment (Liverpool) ((reduced to cadre left 19 June 1918)
20th (Service) Battalion, King's Regiment (Liverpool) (disbanded February 1918)
2nd Battalion, Bedfordshire Regiment (joined from 21st Brigade 20 December 1915, transferred to 90th Brigade February 1918)
89th Machine Gun Company (joined 13 March 1916, moved to 30th Battalion M.G.C. 1 March 1918)
89th Trench Mortar Battery (joined by 16 June 1916)

On reorganisation in July 1918:

2nd Battalion, South Lancashire Regiment
7/8th (Service) Battalion, Royal Inniskilling Fusiliers
2/17th (County of London) Battalion, London Regiment
89th Trench Mortar Battery

 90th Brigade 

16th (Service) Battalion, Manchester Regiment (1st City) (left June 1918)
17th (Service) Battalion, Manchester Regiment (2nd City) (left February 1918)
18th (Service) Battalion, Manchester Regiment (3rd City) (disbanded February 1918)
19th (Service) Battalion, Manchester Regiment (4th City) (left December 1915)
2nd Battalion, Royal Scots Fusiliers (joined December 1915 left April 1918)
2nd Battalion, Bedfordshire Regiment (joined from 89th Brigade February 1918 left May 1918)
14th (Service) Battalion, Argyll & Sutherland Highlanders (joined April 1918, left June 1918)
90th Machine Gun Company (joined 13 March 1916, moved to 30th Battalion M.G.C. 1 March 1918)
90th Trench Mortar Battery (formed by 16 June 1916)

On reorganisation in July 1918:

2/14th (County of London) Battalion, London Regiment
2/15th (County of London) Battalion, London Regiment
2/16th (County of London) Battalion, London Regiment
90th Trench Mortar Battery

 91st Brigade 

The brigade formed in April 1915 and moved to the 7th Division in December of that year, swapping with the 21st Brigade.

20th (Service) Battalion, Manchester Regiment (5th City)
21st (Service) Battalion, Manchester Regiment (6th City)
22nd (Service) Battalion, Manchester Regiment (7th City)
24th (Service) Battalion, Manchester Regiment (Oldham)

Divisional Troops
11th (Service) Battalion, South Lancashire Regiment (joined as Divisional Pioneer Battalion May 1915, left as cadre June 1918)
6th (Service) Battalion, South Wales Borderers (joined as Divisional Pioneer Battalion July 1918)
226th Machine Gun Company (joined 19 July 1917, moved to 30th Battalion M.G.C. 1 March 1918)
19th Motor Machine Gun Battery (joined 10 February 1916, left 6 June 1916)
30th Battalion M.G.C. (formed 1 March 1918, reduced to cadre 13 May 1918 replaced on 29 June 1918 by a redesignated “A” Bn, MGC)
Divisional Mounted Troops	
D Sqn, Lancashire Hussars (left 10 May 1916)
30th Divisional Cyclist Company, Army Cyclist Corps (left 21 May 1916)
30th Divisional Train Army Service Corps
186th, 187th, 188th and 189th Companies (joined from 22nd Division in France in November 1915)
40th Mobile Veterinary Section Army Veterinary Corps
227th Divisional Employment Company (joined 24 May 1917)

Royal Artillery
CXLVIII Brigade, Royal Field Artillery (R.F.A.)
CXLIX Brigade, R.F.A.
CL Brigade, R.F.A. (left 2 January 1917)
CLI (Howitzer) Brigade, R.F.A. (broken up 26 August 1916)
11th (Hull) Heavy Battery, Royal Garrison Artillery (R.G.A.) (joined June 1915, left March 1916)
125th Heavy Battery, R.G.A. (raised with the Division but moved independently to France on 29 April 1916)
30th Divisional Ammunition Column R.F.A.
V.30 Heavy Trench Mortar Battery, R.F.A. (joined by 7 October 1916, left by 11 February 1918)
X.30, Y.30 and Z.30 Medium Mortar Batteries, R.F.A.(joined April 1916, 11 February 1918, Z broken up and batteries distributed among X and Y batteries)

Royal Engineers
200th (County Palatine) Field Company
201st (County Palatine) Field Company
202nd (County Palatine) Field Company
30th Divisional Signals Company

Royal Army Medical Corps
111th Field Ambulance (left September 1915)
112th Field Ambulance (left September 1915)
113th Field Ambulance (left September 1915)
70th Sanitary Section (left 2 April 1917)
96th Field Ambulance(joined November 1915)
97th Field Ambulance (joined November 1915)
98th Field Ambulance (joined November 1915'')

General officer commanding 
 Major-General Sir John Stuart Mackenzie Shea 1916
 Major-General W. I. Williams 1917–1918
 Major-General Neill Malcolm December 1918 – February 1919

See also

 List of British divisions in World War I

Notes

Bibliography

External links 
The British Army in the Great War: The 30th Division

Further reading 

Infantry divisions of the British Army in World War I
Kitchener's Army divisions
Military units and formations established in 1915
Military units and formations disestablished in 1919
1915 establishments in the United Kingdom